The Wilmington and Weldon Railroad (W&W) name began use in 1855, having been originally chartered as the Wilmington and Raleigh Railroad in 1834. It was constructed in  gauge. At its terminus in Weldon, North Carolina, it connected with the Seaboard and Roanoke Railroad (to Portsmouth, Virginia) and the Petersburg Railroad (to Petersburg, Virginia). The railroad also gave rise to the city of Goldsboro, North Carolina, the midpoint of the W&W RR and the railroad intersection with the North Carolina Railroad.

History
Among the early employees of the W&W RR was assistant engineer William G. Lewis. The future Civil War general began his railroad career in 1858. From 1854 to 1871 S.L. Fremont was Chief Engineer and Superintendent. Fremont, North Carolina, is named in his honor.

During the American Civil War, the railroad was used heavily by the Confederacy for transporting troops and supplies.  The railroad also played a key role in the Siege of Petersburg.  The cities of Wilmington and Goldsboro fell in 1865 at the end of the war, and the railroad was badly damaged.

The railroad managed to rebuild after the war.  By 1866, the bridge over the Cape Fear River was rebuilt, which reconnected the line to Wilmington.  By 1869, the W&W and other railroads in the Carolinas were purchased by a group of Baltimore capitalists including William T. Walters.  This group of lines were advertised as the Atlantic Coast Line, but were still operated independently.

In 1872, the W&W was leased by the Wilmington, Columbia and Augusta Railroad, but this lease ended in 1878 when the WC&A went bankrupt.

The W&W was officially merged into the Atlantic Coast Line Railroad (ACL) on April 21, 1900.  The ACL established its headquarters in Wilmington.  The Wilmington and Weldon Railroad from Weldon to Conentnea would become part of the ACL's main line, with the remaining line south to Wilmington becoming the ACL's Contentnea–Wilmington Line (C Line).

In 1909, the ACL realigned the track in Goldsboro to bypass the center of town in conjunction with the opening of Goldsboro Union Station.  The line's original alignment along Center Street was removed in 1925.

The Atlantic Coast Line became the Seaboard Coast Line Railroad in 1967 after merging with their former rival, the Seaboard Air Line Railroad.  In 1980, the Seaboard Coast Line's parent company merged with the Chessie System, creating the CSX Corporation.  The CSX Corporation initially operated the Chessie and Seaboard Systems separately until 1986, when they were merged into CSX Transportation.  The ex-ACL main line is still in service as CSX's A Line.  The former W&W from Contentnea south is now CSX's W&W Subdivision (named in reference to the Wilmington and Weldon Railroad).

Branches
In addition to the main line between its namesake cities, the Wilmington and Weldon Railroad also operated a number of branch lines.

Scotland Neck (Kinston) Branch
The Scotland Neck Branch was built in 1882 by the Scotland Neck Railroad.  It connected with the main line at Pender (just south of Halifax) and ran southeast to Scotland Neck.  In 1883, it was acquired by the W&W and by 1890, it had been extended south to Kinston.  The branch was then known as the Kinston Branch (A Branch) after W&W was merged into the Atlantic Coast Line.  Today, the branch is still in service from Parmele to just north of Kinston.  The remaining line is now CSX's Parmele Subdivision.

Nashville Branch
The Nashville Branch was built in 1887 and ran from the main line at Rocky Mount west to Nashville and Spring Hope.  CSX sold the branch to the Nash County Railroad in 1985.  It was sold again in 2011 to the Carolina Coastal Railway, who operates it today.

Tarboro Branch
The Tarboro Branch was built in 1850 and ran from the main line at Rocky Mount east to Tarboro.  In 1882, the Albemarle and Raleigh Railroad was built which extended the branch east to Williamston on the Roanoke River.  It was extended again in 1890 to Plymouth.  The W&W acquired the Albemarle and Raleigh Railroad in 1885.

After the W&W was merged into the Atlantic Coast Line, the branch was part of the ACL's Norfolk–Rocky Mount Line (B Line) west of Tarboro (which continued to Norfolk via the former Norfolk and Carolina Railroad).  East of Tarboro, it was known as the Plymouth Branch (BC Branch).  The branch is still in service today and it is CSX's Tarboro Subdivision.

Midland Branch
The Midland Branch ran from the main line at Goldsboro west to Smithfield.  It was originally chartered as the Smithfield & Goldsboro Railroad and it was built by its parent company, the Midland North Carolina Railway.  It was acquired by the W&W in 1885.  It was named the Midland Branch after the Midland North Carolina Railway.  The branch closely paralleled the North Carolina Railroad (which was operated by the Southern Railway).  Atlantic Coast Line abandoned the Midland Branch in 1930.

Clinton Branch
The Clinton Branch was built in 1887 and ran from the main line at Warsaw west to Clinton.  The Clinton Branch (known today simply as the Clinton Spur) is still in service today and it is partially operated by the Clinton Railroad.

Stations
Main Line

Scotland Neck Branch

Nashville Branch

Tarboro Branch

Midland Branch

Clinton Branch

References

4 ft 8 in gauge railways in the United States
Defunct North Carolina railroads
Predecessors of the Atlantic Coast Line Railroad
Railway companies established in 1855
Railway companies disestablished in 1900
Defunct South Carolina railroads
1855 establishments in North Carolina
1900 disestablishments in North Carolina
American companies disestablished in 1900